The IIHF  World Championship Division II are an annual sports event organized by the International Ice Hockey Federation. The division championships are played in two groups, part of the Ice Hockey World Championships

From 2001 until 2011, the two national teams that finished last in their groups in Division I were relegated to Division II for next year's World Championships. At the Division II Championship, the winner of each group was promoted to next year's Division I, while the loser of each group was relegated to the IIHF World Championship Division III.  Beginning in 2012, the Group A champion was promoted to Division I Group B, and was replaced by that tournament's last placed team.  The Group B champion was promoted to Group A, and was replaced by the team relegated from there.  Last place in Group B is relegated to Division III, being replaced by their champion.

The Division II World championships have been played in their current format since 2001.  Division II was formed from the teams ranked 29th to 40th, which was the five lowest-placing teams in Pool C, and the seven best teams from Pool D.  Beginning in 2012, the two groups became tiered rather than parallel.  Teams qualified for Group A by either being relegated from Division I, or placing 2nd or 3rd in their 2011 groups.  Group B teams were formed from the teams placing 4th, 5th, or promoted from Division III.

Results

Pool C

Champions (1961–2000)
Following the year 2000, Pool C became Division II and was split into two sections as a result of an influx of competing teams.

Summary of participation
51 championships
In 1992, 1994, and 1995, Group C was played in two independent tiers, the results for the nations who were not given the opportunity to win Group C (known as Group C2) in those years are presented along with Group D/Division III.
Division II teams (2001–present) are ranked one through twelve, with this chart assessing gold, silver, and bronze to the nations who ranked 29th, 30th, and 31st overall.

Note 1.  The Federal Republic of Yugoslavia assumed the Socialist Federal Republic of Yugoslavia's position in Group C after a two-year absence in 1995.  In 2003 it was reconstituted as the State Union of Serbia and Montenegro.  After the state's dissolution, Serbia assumed their position in Division II, beginning play in 2007.
Note 2.  Both Poland and Sweden hosted a tournament at this level also.

See also
Ice Hockey World Championships
IIHF World Championship Division I
IIHF World Championship Division III

References

External links
2010 IIHF Championship Program